Storr Island, also known as Yudawala or Yeewadan Ganjal, is an uninhabited island located in the Kimberley region of Western Australia.

It is situated between Doubtful Bay and George Water, near the intersection of the Sale and Glenelg rivers.

Fauna found on the island include the golden bandicoot and many types of birds, including the pied imperial pigeon, sulphur-crested cockatoo, brown honeyeater, white-gaped honeyeater, white-lined honeyeater, silver-crowned friarbird, mangrove golden whistler, leaden flycatcher, northern fantail, black-faced cuckoo-shrike, varied triller and the great bowerbird.

The traditional owners of the area are the Dambimangari people of the Worrorra language group. Their name for the island is Yudawala or Yeewadan Ganjal.

References 

Islands of the Kimberley (Western Australia)
Uninhabited islands of Australia